Ismaila is a town and Union Council of Swabi District in the Khyber-Pakhtunkhwa province of Pakistan. It is located at 34°13'0N 72°15'0E

Its population is about 60,000.

There is a government high school for girls and secondary school for boys. Kernel Sher Khan Cadet college is located here. There is also a basic health unit in the town.
Ismaila is very famous for Chapli Kabab and Faiq Lobia farosh.

Crops like wheat, maize and rice are grown here and the lands are aggregated by the Malakand Canal.

Within about a 10 km radius from Ismaila, there are several archaeological sites. The village of Hund had been the capital of Kabul Shahi for about 300 years. The archaeological site Rani Gatt, part of the ancient Gandhara Kingdom, is also nearby.

Pashto poet Ali Haider Joshi was born in this town in 1914. He was the author of Yusuf Khan and Sherbano, which was turned into the first Pashto movie, Yousuf Khan Sher Bano in 1970.

References

Populated places in Swabi District
Union Councils of Swabi District